Danny Corcoran may refer to:

 Danny Corcoran (ranger) (1916–1938), Newfoundland ranger who died on a solo expedition across the Great Northern Peninsula
 Danny Corcoran (sports administrator) (born 1953), sports administrator in Australian rules football and athletics in Australia